Nika Egadze (born 2 April 2002) is a Georgian figure skater. He is the 2021 CS Cup of Austria champion and the 2021 Volvo Open Cup bronze medalist. On the junior level, he is the 2017 European Youth Olympic bronze medalist and competed in the final segment at the 2020 World Junior Championships.

Personal life 
Egadze was born on 2 April 2002 in Tbilisi, Georgia.

Programs

Competitive highlights 
GP: Grand Prix; CS: Challenger Series; JGP: Junior Grand Prix

Detailed results 
ISU Personal best in bold.

Senior-level results

Junior-level results

References

External links 
 
 

2002 births
Living people
Male single skaters from Georgia (country)
Sportspeople from Tbilisi